List of the protected natural heritage on the administrative territory of Belgrade, the capital of Serbia.

Protected areas

Landscapes of outstanding features

Natural monuments

Protected habitats

Internationally important areas

Ecologically important areas 

The surroundings of some protected area are declared ecologically important areas, a wider, super-areas which may comprise more, territorially disconnected, singular protected areas. Together, they all form the proclaimed ecological network of Serbia, and are based on some internationally declared important areas.

Internationally important ecological corridors

Future and former protected areas

Planned and proposed protected areas 

Areas which have been surveyed for protection, are placed under the "preliminary protection". It means they are treated as being protected, until the protection is officially declared (in which case it continues), or rejected.

Former protected natural heritage

Notes 
Notes:

References 

Geography of Belgrade
Protected areas of Serbia